BMCC Tribeca Performing Arts Center is a performing arts venue located in Lower Manhattan inside the Borough of Manhattan Community College (BMCC) on 199 Chambers Street, New York, NY. Tribeca's two main theater spaces are Theatre One (a 913-seat theater) and Theatre Two (which is 262 seats), both of which can be rented out. The venue's programming includes music concerts, children's theater, stand-up acts, film retrospectives as well as local and international dance companies. It has also been one of the venues for the annual Tribeca Film Festival.

References

External links
 BMCC Tribeca on Yelp

Theatres in Manhattan